Charles Wayman (16 May 1921 – 26 February 2006) was an English footballer.

Wayman, who was born in Chilton, Bishop Auckland, was a prolific centre-forward in the first decade after the Second World War. Newcastle United signed him from Spennymoor United in September 1941, while he was working as a miner at Chilton Colliery. He later formed a great partnership with Ted Bates at Southampton. In total, he played for five Football League clubs between 1941 and 1958. A knee injury forced his retirement from league football. He later coached Evenwood Town and became a sales manager for the Scottish and Newcastle brewery.

His brother, Frank, was also a professional footballer.

References

Obituary

1921 births
2006 deaths
Sportspeople from Bishop Auckland
Footballers from County Durham
Association football forwards
English footballers
Darlington F.C. players
Middlesbrough F.C. players
Newcastle United F.C. players
Preston North End F.C. players
Southampton F.C. players
English Football League players
First Division/Premier League top scorers
Portsmouth F.C. wartime guest players
Association football coaches
FA Cup Final players